The Application Services Library (ASL) is a public domain framework of best practices used to standardize processes within Application Management, the discipline of producing and maintaining information systems and applications. The term "library" is used because ASL is presented as a set of books describing best practices from the IT industry.

ASL is closely related to the frameworks ITIL (for IT Service Management) and BiSL (for Information Management and Functional Management) and to the Capability Maturity Model (CMM).

The ASL framework was developed because ITIL proved inadequate for Application Management. At that time, ITIL lacked specific guidance for application design, development, maintenance and support. Newer ITIL versions, particularly V3, have increasingly addressed the Application Development and Application Management domains; the ASL BiSL Foundation has published a white paper comparing ITIL v3 and ASL.

ASL was developed in the late nineties in the Netherlands, originally as the proprietary R2C model, which evolved into ASL in 2000. In 2001 it was donated by the IT Service Provider PinkRoccade to the ASL Foundation, now the ASL BiSL Foundation. The version ASL2 was published in 2009.

Purpose
The ASL2 is intended to support Application Management by providing tools. Two main categories of aids are defined:
Descriptions of the processes for Application Management. Plus the use of best-practises 
Standard terminology, avoiding the pitfall of talking about different topics while using the same words.

Structure of ASL2
ASL2 contains 3 levels, 6 clusters of processes (3 on the operational level, 1 on the tactical level, 2 on the strategic level) and a totality of 26 processes.

Operational level

Application Support cluster

There are 4 processes within the Application Support cluster. The processes in the Service Organisation cluster support the daily use of the information systems. The processes in this cluster are: 
Use Support 
Configuration Management 
IT Operation Management
Continuity Management 
These processes have as well been defined in the ITIL framework. The processes are similar, but are viewed from another point of view, therefore the activities in each of these processes may differ from the activities in an ITIL-environment.

Application Maintenance and Renewal cluster

There are 5 processes within the Application Maintenance and Renewal cluster. Within this cluster the majority of the work of Application Development is done. A major part of the work of Application Management deals with designing, programming and testing applications and information systems. Processes are:
Impact analysis
Design
Realization
Testing 
Implementation
These processes are not described at all in the ITIL V1 framework, but do have their counterparts in BiSL, the model for Information management / Functional Management.

Connecting Processes Operational Level cluster

There are 2 processes within the Connecting Processes Operational Level cluster. The connecting processes aim at the synchronisation of the activities between Service Organisation/operations (using the applications) and development and maintenance (changing the applications). The two processes included are: 
Change Management 
Software Control and Distribution

Management level

Management Processes cluster

There are 5 processes within the Management Processes cluster. The processes in this cluster are used in the management of the activities within the clusters on the operational level. The processes are located on the tactical level, are used for steering the operational processes. The processes included are: 
Contract Management
Planning and Control
Quality Management
Financial Management
Supplier Management

Strategic level

Application Strategy cluster

There are 5 processes within the Application Strategy cluster. Applications live for longer than expected. Systems, functionality, concepts and structure of information systems remain stable over many years. This knowledge is rarely used. It is important that, while maintaining and enhancing systems, there is a clear view needed what the demands are in the future, and based on that, what and how the future of these applications should look like. 
This view, the application management strategies, is created within the cluster Application Strategy. The processes in this cluster are:
IT Developments Strategy
Customer Organizations Strategy
Customer Environment Strategy
Application Life Cycle Management
Application Portfolio Management

Application Management Organization Strategy cluster

There are 5 processes within the Application Management Organization Strategy cluster. Also the future of the Application Management organisation, with aspects as skills and capabilities, markets and customers, is very important. Creating the organisation management strategies for this is the aim of Application Management Organization Strategy cluster. Processes in this cluster include:
Account and Market Definition
Capabilities Definition
Technology Definition
Supplier Definition
Service Delivery Definition

ASL2 Maturity Model

There is also ASL2 Maturity Model with 5 levels of process maturity:
Level 1 - Initial
Level 2 - Repeatable
Level 3 - Defined and managed
Level 4 - Optimizing
Level 5 - Chain

References

ASL 2 - A Framework for Application Management (book on ASL v2, 2011)
ASL 2 Self-assessment (book on ASL v2, 2014)
ASL 2: A Pocket Guide (book on ASL v2, 2013)
Official whitepapers:
ASL 2, An introduction
ITIL® v3 and ASL - Sound Guidance for Application Management and Application Development

External links
Official ASL BiSL Foundation website

IT service management
Public domain